The Minister for Education and Training is the member of the Government of Western Australia responsible for maintenance and improvement of Western Australia's system of education, and is answerable to the Parliament for all actions taken by the Department of Education under their authority. The holder of the office is usually an elected member of parliament from the ruling party or coalition, presently Tony Buti of the Labor Party.

Until the Daglish Ministry in 1904, when the role was separately established, the responsibility for Education generally lay with the Colonial Secretary.

Ministers for Education

Notes 
 Politicians were not officially associated with organised parties until 1904.
 The position was known as Minister for Education and Training from 14 January 2003 to 23 September 2008, when it reverted to its previous name. See

References

Sources 

  (no ISBN)
 Hansard indexes and Western Australian Government Gazettes, 1890–2010

Education
Ministers, Education
Education in Western Australia
1890 establishments in Australia